Sternbergia minoica is a flowering plant species in the family Amaryllidaceae. It is endemic to the Island of Crete in the Mediterranean.

References

Amaryllidoideae
Plants described in 2001
Flora of Crete
Flora of Greece